Evan Michael Tanner, or simply Tanner, is a fictional character created by American author Lawrence Block. Tanner appears in eight novels. Seven of those were published in the 5-year period 1966–1970; the eighth appeared in 1986 after a 28 year gap.  

A former American soldier who lost the need for sleep after a brain injury, Tanner's adventures take him across the world, and his is particularly devoted to "lost causes".

Character overview 
Tanner is known to have fought in the Korean War, when his brain's sleep center was destroyed by a stray piece of shrapnel, making him a permanent insomniac. As a result of his injury, he does not sleep, nor does he need to. He was discharged after this incident with a pension of $112 dollars per month (as mentioned in several of the novels), despite becoming an idea of the "perfect soldier"- one who is constantly awake.

Tanner is subject to fatigue after exertion and needs time to recover or regain his strength. When tired, he uses meditation and hatha yoga techniques to relax and enter a semi-trance state. But otherwise he has no need for sleep and suffers no ill effects from not sleeping. 

He fills his time productively by reading voraciously, learning multiple languages and (among other activities) charging stiff fees to write term papers, dissertations and other documents for college students. He is enamored of lost causes, admiring the dedication to stay committed against overwhelming odds. Tanner is a member of dozens of small groups espousing various fringe causes, such as support for royal pretenders or the restoration of monarchies, political secessionist movements, and the Flat Earth Society. These groups provide a loose network of sympathizers and helpers which Tanner utilizes as he travels the world on adventures. At the end of the first novel he is recruited to join a US government agency so secretive it does't have a name. Yet Tanner is not a spy or espionage agent in the usual sense, and is usually not motivated by duty or political ideology. He more typically is motivated by profit, wooing a beautiful woman, or a sense of adventure and curiosity. The often humorous tone of the books is reflected in their titles, such as puns (The Cancelled Czech, and The Scoreless Thai) or cultural references (Me Tanner, You Jane). 

Block regards Tanner as an important development in his writing career. Tanner was the author's first successful series character who maintained an audience for several books over the years, paving the way for later successful series with the characters Chip Harrison, Matthew Scudder and Bernie Rhodenbarr who all debuted in the 1970s. Though Block had published prolifically since the 1950s, he felt the Tanner books were his first truly original creations, and not derivative imitations.

Novel summaries 

 The Thief Who Couldn't Sleep, 1966
Set-up: Evan has a brain injury that won't let him sleep. Instead he supports odd causes, learns languages, and travels the world. This one, he travels to the far side of Turkey (now Türkiye) to dig up gold. He stirs-up a lot of trouble. 
 The Canceled Czech 1966
Even is contacted by a super-duper-ultra secret organization and tasked with rescuing an un-sorry Nazi from a fortified castle in Prague. 
 Tanner's Twelve Swingers, 1967
In the dark days of the Cold War, Evan goes past the Iron Curtain into Latvia to rescue a friend's girlfriend from the Communists. She won't leave without eleven delightfully limber teammates, a subversive author, and 6 year old royalty. 
 The Scoreless Thai a.k.a. Two for Tanner, 1968
Evan goes to Thailand to seek a beautiful singer who may also be a jewel thief. Posing as a butterfly hunter, he himself is netted by bandits, makes a deal with a horny young man, gets lost in the malaria-filled jungle, starts a little war. 
 Tanner's Tiger, 1968
Cold War tensions at the Montreal World's Fair. Cuban exhibit, heap of drugs, Minna the little girl in line for the Lithuanian throne, that other girl/woman then Queen of England, and a hot woman in a tiger skin. 
 Here Comes a Hero a.k.a. Tanner's Virgin, 1968
Evan rescues Phaedra who has been abducted by white slavers in the Afghan wilderness. Her honor is at stake, trigger-happy terrorists, a few assassinations. 
 Me Tanner, You Jane, 1970
Evan is in Africa. The petty despot of Modonoland has gone missing, and taken the state treasury. Featuring the CIA, white supremacists, revolutionaries, and a blond jungle bombshell named Sheena. 
 Tanner on Ice, 1998
Evan had got put in cryo-suspended animation, but thawed. Little Minna, a child in/of the 1960s, was not only a full grown beautiful woman, she had a keyboard attached to a TV set with a fruit on it. (Apple) So Evan sets out to Burma (now Myanmar) to topple the government and rescue a beautiful prisoner.
 The Thief Who Couldn't Sleep
Tanner takes an avid interest in political causes, primarily the ones existing in the late 1960s, when the series first takes place. He is also very good at "coming across money", so when he meets a black-haired beauty whose Grandmother has fantastic tales of a fortune in European gold hidden under her front porch in a war-torn country, he embarks on a profitable journey. Though only intending to extract 573 pounds of pure gold, he accidentally starts a revolution in Macedonia when his principled support for the rebels' cause is interpreted as a guarantee of American military support. From there, Tanner ends up in a Turkish jail, and gets hired by a government agency so secret that even the CIA has never heard of them.
 The New Job
Tanner's new employer may have mistaken him as an informer to one of their dead agents, but that doesn't stop him from taking over the position and rising to become one of their best agents. As one of their men, he must "cancel" a Czech who was a former Nazi, smuggle 12 beautiful female Olympians, one princess, and a defector aboard a Soviet fighter plane to America, end a slavery ring, and rescue a cannibal named Jane from Africa.

From the 1970s to the 1990s 

While meeting with a double crossing Scandinavian resistance operative, Tanner was incapacitated and cryogenically frozen, though not intended to be brought back. In 1997, his freezing machine was found within a secret chamber of a house being remodelled and repaired, with Tanner still inside. Due to new technology, doctors were able to reanimate a perfectly preserved Tanner, and he was let loose in modern-day New York City. When he came back home, he found that it was occupied by his adopted daughter, Minna, the rightful heir to the Lithuanian throne, now fully grown. He also finds that he still has a job with his old boss, even though he's been out of it for 25 years. His new assignment takes him to former Burma (now called Myanmar), and the deadly Orient, which he hasn't seen since the Korean War. To make things even more complicated, he has to bring back an exiled Russian beauty, overcome malaria, and get used to the new world.

Evan Tanner novels 
 The Thief Who Couldn't Sleep (1966) 
 The Canceled Czech (1966)
 Tanner's Twelve Swingers (1967)
 The Scoreless Thai (a.k.a. Two for Tanner) (1968)
 Tanner's Tiger (1968)
 Here Comes a Hero (1968) (a.k.a. Tanner's Virgin)
 Me Tanner, You Jane (1970)
 Tanner on Ice (1998)

References

Fictional secret agents and spies
Series of books
Literary characters introduced in 1966
Characters in American novels of the 20th century